Michaela Sokolich-Beatson (born 2 October 1996 in Auckland, New Zealand) is a New Zealand netball player. She plays for the Northern Mystics in the ANZ Premiership, having debuted in 2016. She was selected for the New Zealand national netball team, the Silver Ferns, to compete in the 2018 Commonwealth Games, where New Zealand finished fourth. She was also selected in the Silver Ferns travelling squad for the 2019 Netball World Cup as a potential injury replacement for defender Katrina Rore.

References

External links
 Michaela Sokolich-Beatson at ANZ Premiership 
 

1996 births
Living people
Netball players from Auckland
New Zealand people of Croatian descent
New Zealand netball players
Northern Mystics players
New Zealand international netball players
Commonwealth Games competitors for New Zealand
Netball players at the 2018 Commonwealth Games
2019 Netball World Cup players
ANZ Premiership players